Groombridge 34 is a binary star system in the northern constellation of Andromeda. It was listed as entry number 34 in A Catalogue of Circumpolar Stars, published posthumously in 1838 by British astronomer Stephen Groombridge. This positions the pair among the nearest stars to the Solar System.

Both components are small, dim red dwarf stars that are too faint to be seen with the naked eye. They orbit around their common barycenter in a fairly eccentric orbit with a separation of about 93 AU and a period of around 1,230 years. Both stars exhibit random variation in luminosity due to flares and they have been given variable star designations: the brighter member Groombridge 34 A is designated GX And, while the smaller component is designated GQ And.

The star system has a relatively high proper motion of 2.9 arc seconds per year, and is moving away from the Solar System at a velocity of 11.6 km/s. It achieved perihelion some 15,000 years ago when it came within  of the Sun.

GX Andromedae
The most massive and luminous component of the pair has the variable star designation GX Andromedae. It is a main-sequence red dwarf star of spectral type M1.4 that varies its brightness due to stellar flares. Gaia observations suggest a rotation period of 44 days and a magnetic activity cycle of roughly 9 years.

GQ Andromedae
The smaller companion bears the variable star name GQ Andromedae. It is a red dwarf main sequence star that undergoes flare events like the primary; it has a spectral type M4.1, so it also has a lower effective temperature.

Planetary system
In August 2014, a planet orbiting around Groombridge 34 A was reported. The planet's existence was deduced from analysis of the radial velocities of the parent star by the Eta-Earth Survey using HIRES at Keck Observatory. At the time of its discovery, it was the sixth-nearest-known exoplanet.

Using the CARMENES spectrograph combined with the measurements of the HARPS and HIRES spectrographs, researchers failed to detect the purported Groombridge 34 Ab. However, they did propose that another planet (Groombridge 34 Ac, GJ 15 Ac) could be orbiting the parent star.

This discrepancy was later reconciled with new HIRES observations, covering a longer span of time, where both planets were recovered, constraining their minimum mass to 3.03  for Groombridge 34 Ab and 36  for Groombridge Ac. Their orbital periods are 11.4 and approximately 7,600 days, respectively. To date, this is the fourth-closest confirmed multi-planet system to the Sun, hosting the longest-period Neptune-mass exoplanet discovered so far.

See also
List of nearest stars and brown dwarfs

References

External links
SolStation entry
www.richweb.f9.co.uk/
Image Groombridge 34
The One Hundred Nearest Star Systems, RECONS

Andromeda (constellation)
Flare stars
M-type main-sequence stars
Binary stars
001326
001475
0015
0034
BD+43 0044
Local Bubble
Andromedae, GQ
TIC objects
Planetary systems with two confirmed planets